The demographics of Togo include ethnicity, population density, age, education level, health, economic status and religious affiliations.

Language and ethnicity
Togo's population of  million people ( est.) is composed of about 21 ethnic groups, the two biggest being the Tèm in the Centre (Bafilo, Sokodé, Sotouboua (about 22% of the population); they also live in Ghana and Bénin in big numbers. Tèms have a lot ties with 2/3 of the country as they live in the center of Togo. They exercise diversely almost all occupations from farmers, motors mechanic to business people] and Ewe in the South (about 21% of the population)).
Dagomba is the first most common language in the north, where other Gur languages such as Mossi and Gourma are also found.

The ethnic groups of the coastal region, particularly Ewe and Gen language (or Mina) (the two major African languages in the south), constitute the bulk of the civil servants, professionals, and merchants, due in part to the former colonial administrations which provided greater infrastructure development in the south. Most of the southern peoples use these two closely related languages, which are spoken in commercial sectors throughout Togo.

The Kabye live on marginal land and traditionally have emigrated south from their home area in the Kara region to seek employment. Their historical means of social advancement has been through the military and law enforcement forces, and they continue to dominate these services.

Other groups include the Akposso on the Central Plateau, the Ana people who are related to the Yoruba, and live in the center of the country, in the strip between Atakpame and Tchamba, the Bassar in the Centre-West, the Tchamba in the Centre-East and the Konkombas in the upper region of Bassar, the Lambas in the Kandé region, the Hausa, the Tamberma, the Losso and the Ouachi.

Indians have a presence in Togo. White African settlers descended from the original French and German colonials make up less than 1% of the total population along with Togo's minute Lebanese community. The remaining 99% are indigenous: most people in this category hail from one of thirty-seven different tribes.

Population
Population distribution is very uneven due to soil and terrain variations. The population is generally concentrated in the south and along the major north-south highway connecting the coast to the Sahel. Age distribution is also uneven; nearly one-half of Togolese are less than fifteen years old.

French, the official language, is used in administration and documentation. The public primary schools combine French with Ewe or Kabye as languages of instruction, depending on the region. English is spoken in neighboring Ghana and is taught in Togolese secondary schools. As a result, many Togolese, especially in the south and along the Ghana border, speak some English.

The proportion of children below the age of 15 in 2010 was 39.6%, 56.9% was between 15 and 65 years of age, while 3.4% was 65 years or older
.

Population by Sex and Age Group (Census 06.XI.2010): 

Population Estimates by Sex and Age Group (Estimates 01.VII.2020): 

≠

Vital statistics
Registration of vital events is in Togo not complete. The Population Departement of the United Nations prepared the following estimates. Population estimates account for under numeration in population census.

Source: UN DESA, World Population Prospects, 2022

Fertility and births
Total Fertility Rate (TFR) (Wanted Fertility Rate) and Crude Birth Rate (CBR):

Fertility data as of 2013-2014 and 2017 (DHS Program):

Life expectancy at birth

Other demographic statistics 
The following demographic statistics of Togo in 2022 are from the World Population Review.

One birth every 2 minutes	
One death every 8 minutes	
One net migrant every 288 minutes	
Net gain of one person every 3 minutes

The following demographic statistics are from the CIA World Factbook, unless otherwise indicated.

Population
8,492,333 (2022 est.)
8,176,449 (July 2018 est.)

Religions
Christian 42.3%, folk religion 36.9%, Muslim 14%, Hindu <1%, Buddhist <1%, Jewish <1%, other <1%, none 6.2% (2020 est.)

Age structure

0-14 years: 39.73% (male 1,716,667/female 1,703,230)
15-24 years: 19.03% (male 817,093/female 820,971)
25-54 years: 33.26% (male 1,423,554/female 1,439,380)
55-64 years: 4.42% (male 179,779/female 200,392)
65 years and over: 3.57% (2020 est.) (male 132,304/female 175,074)

0-14 years: 40.13% (male 1,646,438 /female 1,634,609)
15-24 years: 19.1% (male 779,774 /female 782,192)
25-54 years: 32.96% (male 1,339,150 /female 1,356,020)
55-64 years: 4.34% (male 167,575 /female 187,432)
65 years and over: 3.46% (male 122,175 /female 161,084) (2018 est.)

Birth rate
31.86 births/1,000 population (2022 est.) Country comparison to the world: 25th
32.8 births/1,000 population (2018 est.) Country comparison to the world: 30th

Death rate
5.27 deaths/1,000 population (2022 est.) Country comparison to the world: 188th
6.8 deaths/1,000 population (2018 est.) Country comparison to the world: 135th

Total fertility rate

4.23 children born/woman (2022 est.) Country comparison to the world: 25th
4.32 children born/woman (2018 est.) Country comparison to the world: 26th

Population growth rate
2.48% (2022 est.) Country comparison to the world: 24th
2.61% (2018 est.) Country comparison to the world: 18th

Median age
total: 20 years. Country comparison to the world: 196th
male: 19.7 years
female: 20.3 years (2020 est.)

total: 19.9 years. Country comparison to the world: 196th
male: 19.6 years
female: 20.1 years (2018 est.)

Mother's mean age at first birth
25 years (2017 est.)
note: median age at first birth among women 25-29

21 years (2013/14 est.)
note: median age at first birth among women 25-29

Contraceptive prevalence rate
23.9% (2017)
19.9% (2013/14)

Demographic profile
Togo’s population is estimated to have grown to four times its size between 1960 and 2010. With nearly 60% of its populace under the age of 25 and a high annual growth rate attributed largely to high fertility, Togo’s population is likely to continue to expand for the foreseeable future. Reducing fertility, boosting job creation, and improving education will be essential to reducing the country’s high poverty rate. In 2008, Togo eliminated primary school enrollment fees, leading to higher enrollment but increased pressure on limited classroom space, teachers, and materials. Togo has a good chance of achieving universal primary education, but educational quality, the underrepresentation of girls, and the low rate of enrollment in secondary and tertiary schools remain concerns.

Population distribution
one of the more densely populated African nations with most of the population residing in rural communities, density is highest in the south on or near the Atlantic coast.

Net migration rate
-1.81 migrant(s)/1,000 population (2022 est.) Country comparison to the world: 167th
0 migrant(s)/1,000 population (2018 est.) Country comparison to the world: 99th

Dependency ratios
total dependency ratio: 81.2 (2015 est.)
youth dependency ratio: 76.2 (2015 est.)
elderly dependency ratio: 5.1 (2015 est.)
potential support ratio: 19.8 (2015 est.)

Urbanization
urban population: 43.9% of total population (2022)
rate of urbanization: 3.6% annual rate of change (2020-25 est.)

urban population: 41.7% of total population (2018)
rate of urbanization: 3.76% annual rate of change (2015-20 est.)

Life expectancy at birth
total population: 71.36 years. Country comparison to the world: 166th
male: 68.76 years
female: 74.03 years (2022 est.)

total population: 65.8 years
male: 63.1 years
female: 68.6 years (2018 est.)

total population: 54.69 years
male: 52.75 years
female: 56.7 years (2000 est.)

Major infectious diseases
degree of risk: very high (2020)
food or waterborne diseases: bacterial and protozoal diarrhea, hepatitis A, and typhoid fever
vectorborne diseases: malaria, dengue fever, and yellow fever
water contact diseases: schistosomiasis
animal contact diseases: rabies
respiratory diseases: meningococcal meningitis

Ethnic groups
African (37 tribes; largest and most important are Tém in the centre and Kabyè in the north; and Ewé, Mina in the south) 99%, European and Syrian-Lebanese less than 1%

HIV Prevalence 
Adult infection rate 2.1% (2017 est.)

People living with HIV/Aids 110,000 (2017 est.)

Death rate 4,700 (2017 est.)

Education expenditures
5% of GDP (2019) Country comparison to the world: 65th

Sex ratio
at birth:
1.03 male(s)/female
under 15 years:
1.01 male(s)/female
15-64 years:
0.95 male(s)/female
65 years and over:
0.78 male(s)/female
total population:
0.97 male(s)/female (2000 est.)

Literacy
definition: age 15 and over can read and write
total population: 66.5%
male: 80%
female: 55.1% (2019)

total population: 63.7%
male: 77.3%
female: 51.2% (2015 est.)

'total population: 51.7%male: 67%female:'' 37% (1995 est.)

School life expectancy (primary to tertiary education)
total: 13 years
male: 14 years
female: 12 years (2017)

Unemployment, youth ages 15-24
total: 9.5%
male: 12.3%
female: 7.4% (2017 est.)

References